Weekend Marketplace is a two-hour block of paid programming airing on Fox that debuted on January 3, 2009, replacing the 4Kids TV cartoon block due to the termination of the network's time lease agreement with 4Kids Entertainment. The block, which airs on Saturday mornings, is programmed solely with infomercials, which usually air on networks and broadcast television stations during late night and early morning timeslots; such programming, however, has not previously been scheduled on a regular basis by a major broadcast television network.

Beginning on September 13, 2014 in some markets, Weekend Marketplace can be substituted with the internally syndicated Xploration Station block produced by Steve Rotfeld Productions, which provides two hours of educational and informational programming for stations to count toward federally mandated programming requirements; Fox's owned-and-operated stations and Nexstar Media Group, along with several other affiliate groups and individual stations are currently carrying this block instead. Fox continues to offer Weekend Marketplace to stations which chose to purchase E/I programming off the open syndication market. Notably the Fox stations (and one CW station) of Sinclair Broadcast Group were under the latter arrangement until fall 2016, when Sinclair also began to carry Xploration Station, and one station within the Gray Television's portfolio (Fox affiliate WFLX). At least one Sinclair station (WUTV in Buffalo, New York) carries both, carrying Weekend Marketplace on Saturday mornings while splitting the Xploration Station block up and airing it as a weekday strip instead of as a block.

Overview

Branding and title issues
Despite being carried by Fox, the block features no network branding or in-house promotional advertising (or even references to the "Weekend Marketplace" title) for the duration of the block – due to the fact that as it carries infomercials, commercial breaks do not appear during those featured within the block – and is only used mainly as a placeholder title within television listings and industry media; most stations that carry the block disregard this title when they distribute their listings to guide providers, and it usually is listed as four separate segments of "paid programming" instead so that viewers are not misled about the block's content. In addition, Fox stated that it ultimately intended to have the block contain programs that resemble normal programming (albeit still prominently advertising a product), though this never occurred. Presently the block consists of four traditional 28½-minute infomercials, with short-form direct response commercials airing at the end of each half-hour; no local station breaks are shown beyond a five-second station identification slot (to fulfill Federal Communications Commission rules) at the top of the first hour.

Scheduling
The block normally airs from 10:00 a.m. to Noon Eastern and Pacific Time, the second half of the timeslot previously used for 4Kids TV, the remaining two-hour time period occupied by the first half of the predecessor block was returned to the network's affiliates, for use to air syndicated, locally produced lifestyle brokered programming, or local weekend morning newscasts.

Since 2013, when Fox began to carry Fox College Football on Saturday mornings (and its coverage has expanded from that point until late night), the block's scheduling has become more erratic as local stations have begun to carry their own pre-game show programming before the games (and game coverage west of the Central Time Zone), along with occasional late morning-early afternoon coverage of Fox College Hoops. In 2019, an 11 a.m. ET/8 a.m. PT pre-game show, Big Noon Kickoff, began to air on Fox, effectively pre-empting Weekend Marketplace from August until the end of November, as the infomercials are not required to be made up elsewhere on the schedule by those affiliates carrying it due to the priority of scheduling E/I programming elsewhere on the weekends. BNK was expanded to two hours in 2020, now airing from 10 a.m. ET/7 a.m. PT.

Affiliate reach
Currently due to the Xploration Station transition and Fox's O&Os and affiliates owned and/or operated by groups such as Tribune ceasing to carry Weekend Marketplace, the block's reach is unknown; however it previously aired until the 2014-15 season on 95% of Fox's stations, both owned-and-operated stations and affiliates. Most, if not all, of the stations that declined to carry 4Kids TV – such as Miami affiliate WSVN and Detroit owned-and-operated station WJBK – have similarly declined Weekend Marketplace (two of the exceptions are Cleveland affiliate WJW and O&O KTBC in Austin, which aired the infomercial block after having declined the network's children's block under its Fox Kids, Fox Box and 4Kids TV iterations for many years).

However, it does not appear that all of the non-Fox stations that picked up 4Kids TV in such markets have continued with the infomercial block (Detroit independent station WMYD airs the block, however CW affiliate KASW in Phoenix, MyNetworkTV affiliate WBFS-TV in Miami, and independent stations WMLW-TV in Milwaukee and WBNX-TV in Cleveland – in that case, tracing back to its pre-2013 existence as a low-power station – declined to carry it). It is unclear whether or not, since the infomercial buyers pay the network for national network reach on Weekend Marketplace, the Fox affiliates that refuse to carry the block have to compensate Fox and/or the infomercial buyers for the lack of broadcast coverage in that market.

Sinclair-operated/Deerfield Media-owned KMYS in San Antonio, which switched from MyNetworkTV to The CW in September 2010, continues to carry the block in lieu of Fox-affiliated sister station KABB and instead airs The CW's brokered E/I block, One Magnificent Morning (programmed by Litton Entertainment), during overnight periods inaccessible to most children. Likewise, One Magnificent Morning's predecessor, Vortexx (programmed by Saban Brands, which acquired most of 4Kids's program library in 2012), was programmed in the same fashion prior to its discontinuance by The CW in September 2014 (KMYS already carries three hours of E/I programming purchased from syndication, allowing it to meet the regulations). In both instances, this is likely because the station was unable to revoke the deal to carry Weekend Marketplace. In October 2021, KMYS's main-channel schedule moved to sister station WOAI-TV as a subchannel as part of Sinclair consolidating affiliations on directly-owned stations, with KMYS-DT1 becoming an automated affiliate of Dabl. It continues to air in the same scheduling on WOAI-DT2.

References

External links

Fox Broadcasting Company original programming
2009 American television series debuts

Infomercials
2010s American television series